Frank John Coleman (26 April 1888 – 29 November 1948) was an American silent film actor.

He was born on 26 April 1888 in Newburgh, New York. He acted with Charlie Chaplin at Essanay Studios in Los Angeles, and continued with him at Mutual in June 1917.

Partial filmography
The Bank (1915)
Burlesque on Carmen (1915)
The Floorwalker (1916)
The Rink (1916)
The Vagabond (1916)
The Fireman (1916)
The Count (1916)
The Pawnshop (1916)
Behind the Screen (1916)
 The Adventurer (1917)
The Cure (1917)
Easy Street (1917)
The Immigrant (1917)
The Tenderfoot (1917)
A High Diver’s Last Kiss (1918)
A Fresh Start (1920)
The Cave Girl (1921)
The Show (1922)

References

External links 

1888 births
1948 deaths
20th-century American male actors
American male silent film actors
Male actors from New York (state)
People from Newburgh, New York